The 1989 Virginia Cavaliers football team represented the University of Virginia in the 1989 NCAA Division I-A football season.  They went 10–2 in the regular season and were champions of the Atlantic Coast Conference.  They were invited to the 1990 Florida Citrus Bowl, where they were defeated by Illinois.

Schedule

Personnel

Season summary

vs Notre Dame

Largest crowd for college football game at Giants Stadium

at Penn State

at Georgia Tech

Duke

William & Mary

at Clemson

North Carolina

Wake Forest

Louisville

at NC State

at Virginia Tech

Maryland

Florida Citrus Bowl (vs Illinois)

References

Virginia
Virginia Cavaliers football seasons
Atlantic Coast Conference football champion seasons
Virginia Cavaliers football